The International Peace Gardens is a botanical garden located in Jordan Park in Salt Lake City, Utah.

Part of Utah's history, the garden was conceived in 1939 and dedicated in 1952. The International Peace Gardens has welcomed tens of thousands of travelers from every corner of the globe, including exchange partners from Salt Lake's several Sister Cities. The project was brought to fruition by Utah citizen Mrs. Otto (Ruey) Wiesley, working with the Salt Lake City Superintendent of Parks, the Mayor, and the Salt Lake Council of Women. Today, the garden remains under the direction of the Salt Lake Council of Women Past Presidents Council. Each participating Utah-based nation group is allotted a plot in which to create a garden with native plantings and garden architecture and statues of world peace leaders typical of the homeland and its culture. The Peace Gardens currently represents the cultural diversity of 28 gardens and encourages pleasant wandering and meditation by visitors.

Description and history

The purpose of the Salt Lake Council of Women is to take an active interest in community affairs and to promote whatever may contribute to the general welfare of the communities on the Wasatch Front.

The gardens comprise 11 acres and are located in Jordan Park along the banks of the Jordan River at 9th West and 10th South in Salt Lake. They symbolize the true spirit of democracy and world peace, brotherly love, history, literature, and cultural heritage of many lands.

The project was initiated in 1939 by Mrs. Otto Wiesley, Citizenship Chair, for good citizenship and to give foreign origin groups a specific part in the beautification of the city for the coming Centennial Celebration of 1947. It was presented to the City Commission and the Parks department and was given their approval and support.

The garden project was stopped before anything was planted because of the onset of World War II, but was resumed in 1947.

Each of the nationality groups is allotted a garden section which they design, create and plant at their own expense. Plans have to be approved by the City Parks Director before they are implemented. As each garden is completed, it is dedicated and presented to the city, who then assumes the permanent maintenance of the garden.

The United States became the first country represented in the gardens. Its section is the largest of the sections representing countries from the Americas, Europe, Africa, and Asia. The second section to be organized, planted, and dedicated was the Japanese garden. Others followed every year until there were 28 countries represented with others who would like to have a garden, but unfortunately space ran out. Land has opened up on the northwest side of the gardens across the river and has been deeded to the city by Union Pacific; some hope that the gardens will obtain use of it for purposes of expansion.

Sculptures include: A Monument to Peace: Our Hope for the Children, Bauta Stone, the bust of Mahatma Gandhi, The Little Mermaid, Irish Cross, Olmec Head Replica, Peace Cradle, Preaching Buddha, and Spirit Poles.

See also 

 List of botanical gardens in the United States

External links 

 Salt Lake City Parks & Public Lands - International Peace Gardens 
 International Peace Gardens Website
  Independent Site of the Peace Gardens in Salt Lake City
Utah Office of Tourism - International Peace Gardens

1952 establishments in Utah
Botanical gardens in Utah
Geography of Salt Lake City
Peace gardens
Protected areas of Salt Lake County, Utah
Tourist attractions in Salt Lake City